Wideman is the Americanized form of German surname Weidmann meaning ‘huntsman’

Wideman may refer to: 

Chris Wideman (born 1990), American ice hockey player
Dennis Earl Wideman, Canadian professional ice hockey defenceman.
Jamila Wideman (born 1975), American female left-handed point guard basketball player, lawyer and activist.
Johannes Widmann, German mathematician who invented the addition (+) and the subtraction (-) signs.
John Edgar Wideman, American writer, professor at Brown University
Lydia Wideman, former cross-country skier from Finland.
Max Wideman, creator of the first edition of the Project Management Body of Knowledge
Tyler Wideman (born 1995), American basketball player in the Israeli National League

Wideman, Arkansas

See also
Weidman